Macrophomina is a genus of fungi in the family Botryosphaeriaceae. There are two species, Macrophomina limbalis and Macrophomina phaseolina. The fungus can exist as a saprophyte or plant pathogen.

References

Botryosphaeriaceae
Dothideomycetes genera